Applethwaite is a village in the foothills of Skiddaw near Keswick in the English Lake District.  It is in the Borough of Allerdale and the county of Cumbria, and forms part of the civil parish of Underskiddaw, which has a population of 282.
The name derives from it originally being the clearing in a forest with apples in it.

Applethwaite is mentioned in Alfred Wainwright's The Northern Fells guide book. The narrator/nursemaid Hester in "The Old Nurse’s Story" by Elizabeth Gaskell is from this village.

The church

St Marys church in the village is plain with some stained glass windows. The other church here is St John the Evangelist.

Location

See also

Listed buildings in Underskiddaw

References

Villages in Cumbria
Allerdale